State Highway 239 (SH 239) is a state highway in Las Animas County, Colorado. SH 239's southern terminus is at U.S. Route 160 (US 160) in Trinidad, and the northern terminus is at County Route 32 (CR 32) in El Moro.

Route description
SH 239 runs , starting at a junction with  US 160 in Trinidad.  The highway goes north to a ramp for  I-25 northbound, then northeast to end at a junction with CR32 and CR75.

Major intersections

See also

 List of state highways in Colorado

References

External links

239
Transportation in Las Animas County, Colorado